Marlene Font (born 7 February 1954) is a Cuban foil fencer. She competed at the 1976 and 1980 Summer Olympics.

References

1954 births
Living people
Cuban female foil fencers
Olympic fencers of Cuba
Fencers at the 1976 Summer Olympics
Fencers at the 1980 Summer Olympics
Pan American Games medalists in fencing
Pan American Games gold medalists for Cuba
Fencers at the 1975 Pan American Games
20th-century Cuban women
20th-century Cuban people
21st-century Cuban women